The Romaine-1 Generating Station is a 270 MW hydroelectric generating station on the Romaine River in the Côte-Nord region of the province of Quebec, Canada. It is owned and operated by Hydro-Québec.

Location

The dam is on the Romaine River in the municipality of Havre-Saint-Pierre in the Minganie Regional County Municipality, Quebec.
The site is open to visitors, who can visit three floors of the generating station and walk on the dam.

Description

It is zoned rockfill, with a waterproofing screen.
The foundation is treated rock.
Drawdown from peak to minimum water levels is just .

A short canal carries water from just west of the dam to the generating station's water intake.
The plant does not have a feed gallery or a surge chamber.
It has two Francis-type turbine generator units.
The generating station has capacity of 270 MW.
The utilization factor is 0.59.
Annual average production is 1.4 TW.
With its small reservoir, Romaine-1 gives off low and variable greenhouse gas emissions, and in this is similar to a run-of-the-river station.
The Romaine complex as a whole is one of the most efficient in Quebec in terms of CO2 equivalent emissions per TWh.

History

The dams and generating station are part of a huge hydroelectric complex with four dams on the Romaine River.
The overall Romaine project was formally launched by Quebec premier Jean Charest in May 2009.
A  road was built to provide access to the four dams.

The project was completed in 42 months, 7 months ahead of schedule.
On 25 November 2015 Hydro-Québec announced that the generating station had been commissioned with a group of turbine generators producing 135 MW of power.
A second group of generators was planned to start up later that year.
Romaine-1 is the second power station commissioned on the Romaine River. The first was the 640 MW Romaine-2.

In September 2017 Hydro-Québec had said it had no plans for more dams due to the present surplus of electricity.
During the inauguration of Romaine-3 in October 2017, Quebec premier Philippe Couillard confirmed that no more major projects were planned.

Controversies

The company had to negotiate several agreements with the local Innu communities, paying more than CDN$200 million over a 60-year period to compensate for the effects of the dams, roads and electric transmission lines.

There were a number of controversies.
In March 2012 Quebec Route 138 was blocked at Maliotenam by the Innu, who were demanding compensation for the power lines on their territory.
In June 2015 Route 138 was blocked at Pessamit and Maliotenam, and the access road to the construction site was blocked, by construction workers demanding that more local workers be hired.
In July 2015 the road to the site was blocked by the Innu of Natashquan who felt that Hydro-Quebec did not respect the agreement signed in 2008.
In March 2016 a court rejected the demand by Innu families of Uashat mak Mani-utenam to stop the project.
In November 2016 there was controversy over the waste of wood cut in the reservoirs.

Notes

Sources

Dams in Quebec
Minganie Regional County Municipality
Dams completed in 2015
Energy infrastructure completed in 2015